Heart of Gold (Spanish:Alma de Dios) is a 1941 Spanish comedy film directed by Ignacio F. Iquino and starring Amparo Rivelles.

Cast
In alphabetical order
 José Acuaviva as Orencio  
 Matilde Artero as Rosa  
 Juan Barajas as Tío Zuro  
 Trini Borrull as dancer  
 Miguel García as Pepe  
 Manuel González as Adrián  
 Teresa Idel as Marcelina  
 José Isbert as El tío Matías  
 Carlos Larrañaga as Niño de Ezequiela  
 Paco Martínez Soria as Saturiano  
 Guadalupe Muñoz Sampedro as Ezequiela  
 Luis Prendes as Agustín  
 Amparo Rivelles as Eloísa  
 Eulalia Rodriguez as Balbina  
 Francisco Sanz as Pelegrín  
 Pilar Soler as Irene

References

Bibliography 
 Bentley, Bernard. A Companion to Spanish Cinema. Boydell & Brewer 2008.

External links 
 

1941 comedy films
Spanish comedy films
1941 films
1940s Spanish-language films
Films based on works by Carlos Arniches
Films directed by Ignacio F. Iquino
Remakes of Spanish films
Sound film remakes of silent films
Films with screenplays by Ignacio F. Iquino
Spanish black-and-white films
1940s Spanish films